Prosolierius is an extinct genus of rove beetle which existed in what is now Lebanon, Myanmar and Spain during the Barremian through the Albian period. It was described by Margaret K. Thayer, Alfred F. Newton and Stylianos Chatzimanolis in 2012.

References 

Staphylinidae genera
Prehistoric beetle genera
Cretaceous insects
Prehistoric insects of Asia
Fossil taxa described in 2012